The IS128 RNA is a non-coding RNA found in bacteria such as Escherichia coli and Shigella flexneri. The RNA is 209 nucleotides in length. It is found between the sseA and sseB genes. The IS128 RNA was initially identified in a computational screen of the E. coli genome. The function of this RNA is unknown.

See also 
IS061 RNA
IS102 RNA

References

External links 
 

Non-coding RNA